Abdul-Hadi Khalaf (born January 1, 1986 in Homs) is a Syrian football player who is currently playing for Al-Karamah in the Syrian Premier League.

International career
Khalaf plays between 2003 and 2005 for the Under-19 Syrian national team. The Syrian U-19 team that finished in Fourth place in the AFC U-19 Championship 2004 in Malaysia and he was a part of the Syrian U-20 team in the FIFA U-20 World Cup 2005. in the Netherlands.
He plays against Canada, Italy and Colombia in the group-stage of the FIFA U-20 World Cup 2005.

National Team Career Statistics

Honour and Titles

Club 
Al-Karamah
Syrian Premier League:
Winner (4): 2005-06, 2006–07, 2007-08, 2008-09
Syrian Cup:
Winner (3): 2006-07, 2007–08, 2008-09
Syrian Super Cup:
Winner (1): 2007-08
Asian Champions League:
2005-06 Runner-up

National Team
AFC U-19 Championship 2004 Fourth place

References

External links 
 Career stats at goalzz.com
 Career stats at Kooora.com (Arabic)

1986 births
Living people
Syrian footballers
Al-Karamah players
Association football midfielders
Sportspeople from Homs
Syrian Premier League players